The Issaouane Erg (also called Issaouane-N-Irrararene) is an approximately 38,000 km2 erg (sand sea) in Algeria's portion of the Sahara desert, located at .

Topography
The Issaouane Erg is located near the Ahaggar Mountains. It is part of a major dune field that extends from Issaouane Erg in the north to the Sudanese Erg in the south, flanked by the Libyan erg of Murzuq. In the north, the Issaouane Erg ends at the Tinrhert Plateau and in the south at the Fadnoun Plateau. To a large extent it follows the 500-m contour of the surrounding landscape, ergs mostly being confined to basins.

Sand in the Issaouane Erg, below the level of the sand dunes, has accumulated to a depth of 20 to 30 meters. It has barchan dunes as well as star dunes of 300 to 430 meters high. The presence of both barchan dunes (which form due to unidirectional winds) and star dunes (which form when winds from various directions deposit sand) "suggests that wind regimes have changed over time". NASA's Earth Observatory notes all three types of erg dunes are present in the photos of the Issaouane Erg taken from the International Space Station: stationary mega dunes, which can take hundreds of thousands of years to form; mesoscale dunes (including the stardunes), which form on the mega dunes; and yet smaller ones which migrate over the bigger ones. In the NASA images, the light-blue spots in the valleys between the dunes (which are red from iron oxide) are sabkhah, or salt flats, left after the evaporation of accumulated water.

Cultural history
Neolithic artifacts, sculptures and paintings have been found in the Issouane Erg from the Kiffian culture. Trans-Saharan mercantile routes passed through the region, The most popular of which connected Tripoli to Taghaza.

Natural resources
The Issaouane Erg contains oil; the Tifernine oilfield is explored by the Algerian state oil company Sonatrach, which began developing the oilfield with foreign assistance, including from Korea and Spain (Repsol signed an agreement to invest and explore in 1990). The oilfield has been in production since late 1998.

See also
Geography of Algeria
List of ergs

References

Landforms of Algeria
Ergs of Africa
Natural regions of Africa